Andy Murray and Jamie Murray were the defending champions, but lost in the quarterfinals to first seeded Leander Paes and Radek Štěpánek.
Alexander Peya and Bruno Soares won the title, defeating Paes and Štěpánek 6–3, 7–6(7–5) in the final.

Seeds

Draw

Draw

References
 Main Draw

Rakuten Japan Open Tennis Championships - Doubles